The Judo competition in the 2007 Summer Universiade were held in Bangkok, Thailand.

Medal overview

Men's event

Women's event

Medals table

External links
 
 Summer Universiade Bangkok 2007

2007 Summer Universiade
Universiade
2007
Judo competitions in Thailand